The AN/ALQ-135 is an electronic countermeasure (ECM) jamming system produced by Northrop Grumman for the Tactical Electronic Warfare Suite (TEWS) on F-15 Eagle and F-15E Strike Eagle aircraft. The system can jam and track multiple anti-aircraft missiles in addition to other threats. During the Gulf War, the AN/ALQ-135 logged more than 6,600 hours of combat, yet no aircraft were lost to a threat the system protects against.

Development
Since the 1970s, the AN/ALQ-135 system has been a component of F-15 aircraft. The system has been continually upgraded. These upgrades include processor upgrades, durability upgrades, and weight reduction. Now the system is installed on more than 500 F-15s. The band 3 system was first installed in 1988. The band 1.5 system was first installed in F-15s in 2000.

System Information
The modern system consists of five components of band 1.5 and band 3 equipment to cover the full spectrum of threats. The AN/ALQ-135 (v) system consists of the B3 RF Amplifier, B3 Control/Oscillator,  B1.5 RF Amplifier, B1.5 Control/Oscillator, and the LRU-14.

The band 1.5 and band 3 equipment share 70% of their hardware. This means that logistics and maintenance are more easily performed. The band 1.5 and band 3 systems can jam both high band and low band threats.

Variants
AN/ALQ-135D
Used by F-15E
AN/ALQ-135M
Used by F-15K

See also
 List of military electronics of the United States
 F-15 Eagle
 F-15E Strike Eagle
 AN/ALQ-99
 AN/ALQ-128
 AN/ALQ-144

References

External links
 AN/ALQ-135 globalsecurity.org 
 AN/ALQ-135 (V) northrorgrumman.com 
 AN/ALQ-135M northroprumman.com 

Electronic countermeasures
Electronic warfare equipment
Military electronics of the United States
Military equipment introduced in the 1970s